The  Chapecó River (Portuguese, Rio Chapecó) is a river of Santa Catarina state in southeastern Brazil. It is a tributary of the Uruguay River.

The river is fed by streams rising in the Araucárias National Park, a  conservation unit created in 2005.
Other headwaters rise in the  Mata Preta Ecological Station, a fully protected area created in 2005.
The river supplies water to the municipality of Abelardo Luz, Santa Caterina. The Chapecó River Falls are one of the main attractions of the region.

See also
 List of rivers of Santa Catarina
 Tributaries of the Río de la Plata

References

 Map from Ministry of Transport

Rivers of Santa Catarina (state)
Tributaries of the Uruguay River